Trail of the Axe is a 1922 American silent drama film directed by Ernest C. Warde and starring Dustin Farnum, Winifred Kingston and Joseph J. Dowling.

Cast
 Dustin Farnum as 	Dave Malkern
 Winifred Kingston as Betty Somers
 George Fisher as 	Jim Malkern
 Joseph J. Dowling as 	Dr. Somers

References

Bibliography
 Connelly, Robert B. The Silents: Silent Feature Films, 1910-36, Volume 40, Issue 2. December Press, 1998.
 Munden, Kenneth White. The American Film Institute Catalog of Motion Pictures Produced in the United States, Part 1. University of California Press, 1997.

External links
 

1922 films
1922 drama films
1920s English-language films
American silent feature films
Silent American drama films
Films directed by Ernest C. Warde
American black-and-white films
1920s American films